Engenheiro Gastão Mesquita Airport  is the airport serving Cianorte, Brazil.

It is operated by the Municipality of Cianorte under the supervision of Aeroportos do Paraná (SEIL).

Airlines and destinations
No scheduled flights operate at this airport.

Access

See also

List of airports in Brazil

References

External links

Airports in Paraná (state)
Cianorte